Rzepka is a Polish surname and given name.

Meaning and origin
In Polish, the word means kneecap, but the name is actually derived from the diminutive of rzepa (meaning turnip).

Prevalence
Outside of Poland, the name is also prevalent as a surname in Germany and the United States.

Notable people
Notable people with this name include:
 Józef Rzepka (1913-1951), Polish soldier
 Michelle Rzepka (born 1983), American bobsledder
 Piotr Rzepka, Polish football player and manager
 Rzepicha (also known as Rzepka), 9th century Polish ruler

See also
 Rzepa

References

Polish-language surnames